The Decatur and Kate Dickinson House is a historic house located at 411 State Street in Neillsville, Wisconsin. It is locally significant as one of the best examples of the Queen Anne style in the city of Neillsville.

Description and history 
Completed in 1891, the -story house was designed by James J. McGillivray and is heavily adorned with ornamentation associated with the Queen Anne style of architecture, which was widely popular at the time of the houses construction. It was added to the National Register of Historic Places on March 27, 2007.

References

Houses in Clark County, Wisconsin
Houses completed in 1891
Houses on the National Register of Historic Places in Wisconsin
Queen Anne architecture in Wisconsin
1891 establishments in Wisconsin
National Register of Historic Places in Clark County, Wisconsin